Friedrich Gottlieb Nagel (1864-1907) was the co-founder of Kuehne + Nagel, the global transportation and logistics company.

Nagel co-founded Kuehne + Nagel with August Kühne (1855-1932) in Bremen in 1890.

References

1864 births
1907 deaths
Date of birth missing
Date of death missing
German businesspeople